In Times of Fading Light is a 2017 German drama film directed by Matti Geschonneck. The film shows a day in the life of a family in the GDR. It was screened in the Berlinale Special section at the 67th Berlin International Film Festival. It is based on the 2011 novel of the same name by Eugen Ruge.

Cineuropa describes it: "Thematically, dramatically and visually, this is a sombre, intelligent piece in which psychological finesse combines with historical analysis to result in genuine dramatic heft." In Times of Fading Light is an ensemble piece. Geschonneck contributes to this sombre theme challenging societal ideals, which expose the harshness of a new historical day.

Cast
Bruno Ganz as Wilhelm Powileit
Hildegard Schmahl as Charlotte Powileit
Sylvester Groth as Kurt Umnitzer
Alexander Fehling as Alexander "Sascha" Umnitzer
Natalia Belitski as Melitta Umnitzer
Evgenia Dodina as Irina Umnitzer
Angela Winkler as Stine Spier
Stephan Grossmann as Harry Zenk
Nina Antonova as Nadeschda Iwanowna
Thorsten Merten as Tabbert
Gabriela Maria Schmeide as Lisbeth
Sophie Pfennigstorf as Nolle
Inka Friedrich as Vera
Stefan Haschke as Schlinger
Axel Wandtke as Bunke
Jörg Pose as Herr Sondermann
Sarina Radomski as a Friendship Pioneer Leader
Pit Bukowski as Worker
Jean Denis Römer as Supplier
Ronald Kukulies as TBA
Nadja Engel as TBA
Alexander Hörbe as TBA
Rike Eckermann as TBA
Friderikke-Maria Hörbe as TBA

References

External links
 

2017 films
2017 drama films
German drama films
2010s German-language films
Films set in East Germany
Films set in 1989
2010s German films